3 Days with Dad is a 2019 American comedy film written and directed by Larry Clarke and starring Clarke, Tom Arnold, Julie Ann Emery, Mo Gaffney, Jon Gries, Eric Edelstein, J. K. Simmons, Lesley Ann Warren and Brian Dennehy (in his last movie during his lifetime).

Cast

Release
The film had a limited release in the United States on 13 September 2019.

References

External links
 
 

American comedy films
2019 comedy films
2010s English-language films
2010s American films